Mikayla Bowen (born 17 April 2001) is an Australian rules footballer playing for Geelong in the AFL Women's (AFLW). She previously played for the West Coast Eagles. Bowen and Rosie Deegan were West Coast's first two signings prior to its debut in the 2020 AFLW season. Bowen played in the club's first match, against Collingwood.

Junior career 
From Darlington, Perth, Western Australia, Bowen tried athletics, basketball and soccer in her youth before settling on football around 2016, playing recreationally at her school, Helena's College. She also played for Swan Districts, a WAFL Women's (WAFLW) club, in their junior side, winning a best and fairest in 2016 and captaining the team to a premiership in 2017. Bowen also represented her state at the AFL Women's Under 18 Championships from 2017 to 2019. At her final championships, she captained Western Australia. She was named in the All-Australian side's midfield and her state's best and fairest after averaging about 19 disposals, four tackles and seven clearances.

AFLW career

West Coast

2019-2020: Early Career 
After training in West Coast's women's academy, Bowen signed with the club in January 2019. As an expansion club entering the AFLW in 2020, West Coast were permitted to sign up to 10 players from their academy before the end of the 2019 season; Bowen and Deegan were the first announced.

Bowen debuted in the opening round of the 2020 season, as part of West Coast's inaugural team. She recorded eight disposals on debut as she was named on the wing and showed enormous pressure with ten tackles but it was not enough to get her team their first win in their first game. West Coast failed to win their first three games of the season before recording their first win against the Western Bulldogs by four points, it was also her sides only win for the 2020 AFL Women's season.

Bowen's round three match against the GWS Giants was her best game in her first season in the AFL Women's competition where she recorded 14 disposals, 3 tackles and her first goal in her career.

The West Coast Eagles failed to make finals and finished on the bottom of the conference B ladder at the conclusion of the 2020 season.

2021-2022: Improvement and departure from West Coast 
Bowen showed clear improvement in her second season in the competition recording five more goals including a career-high two goals against the Richmond Tigers in round seven and career-high disposal count in round nine against St Kilda with 22 disposals beating her previous records of 21 disposals from round five and eight.

Bowen won a 2021 AFL Women's Rising Star nomination for her role in 's first win of the season, against  by a point. She collected 21 disposals, 7 marks and a goal.

West Coast recorded just one more win for the season and again failed to make finals at the conclusion of the 2021 AFL Women's season and finished twelfth with a two win and seven loss record with a percentage of 53.

Bowen again played every match in the 2022 AFL Women's season and continued to play a key role on the wing for her side but she recorded just one win in the fourth round against St Kilda by two points.

West Coast were the wooden spoon team in the sixth season of the AFL Women's competition, as they finished last on the ladder with a record of one win and nine loss record with a percentage of just 42.9.

Geelong

2022-present: New Start 
In June 2022, Bowen requested a trade away from West Coast and was traded to Geelong for pick 24. She made her club debut against the Richmond Tigers in the opening round of seventh season of the AFL Women's competition and instantly cemented her spot as a starting winger for her new club with 16 disposals in a win.

Bowen has played every possible match in her four seasons in the AFL Women's competition.

Statistics
Statistics are correct to the end of the 2022 AFL Women's season.

|- style="background-color: #EAEAEA"
! scope="row" style="text-align:center" | 2020
|style="text-align:center;"|
| 1 || 6 || 1 || 1 || 34 || 28 || 62 || 5 || 31 || 0.2 || 0.2 || 5.7 || 4.7 || 10.3 || 0.8 || 5.2 || 0
|- 
! scope="row" style="text-align:center" | 2021
|style="text-align:center;"|
| 1 || 9 || 5 || 1 || 84 || 65 || 149 || 35 || 26 || 0.6 || 0.1 || 9.3 || 7.2 || 16.6 || 3.9 || 2.9 || 5
|-
! scope="row" style="text-align:center" | 2022
|style="text-align:center;"|
| 1 || 10 || 2 || 0 || 83 || 43 || 126 || 24 || 58 || 0.2 || 0.0 || 8.3 || 4.3 || 12.6 || 2.4 || 5.8 || 0
|-
! scope="row" style="text-align:center" | S7 (2022)
|style="text-align:center;"|
| 1 || colspan=16|Current season
|-
|- class="sortbottom"
! colspan=3| Career
! 25
! 8
! 2
! 201
! 136
! 337
! 64
! 115
! 0.3
! 0.1
! 8.0
! 5.4
! 13.5
! 2.6
! 4.6
! 5
|}

Personal life 
Bowen's family has strong connections to ballet and football. Her grandmother Terri Charlesworth was West Australian Ballet's first ballerina, while her mother took the same role at Les Ballets de Monte-Carlo. Bowen's uncle played for Swan Districts in the late 1980s, while her great-great-grandfather played for South Melbourne.

She has been a "diehard" supporter of West Coast since her childhood.

References

External links 

Living people
2001 births
Australian rules footballers from Perth, Western Australia
West Coast Eagles (AFLW) players